The Verdict – State vs Nanavati is an 2019 Indian Hindi drama mystery web series created by Ekta Kapoor and produced by Irada Entertainment for online streaming platform ALT Balaji and ZEE5. It is also available on ZEE5. The series stars Manav Kaul, Elli AvrRam, Sumeet Vyas and Viraf Patel as protagonists.

Plot
The series revolves around the 1959 Indian judiciary case, K. M. Nanavati v. State of Maharashtra where an Indian Naval Command Officer, Kawas Nanavati is accused of the murder of Prem Ahuja. The series explores how when Nanavati returns home after a successful mission just to find out that his wife Slyvia Nanavati is having an extra-marital affair with Prem Ahuja just because he cannot fulfil her desires as he bound to stay on his duty. The series is an intriguing tale of jealousy, murder, mystery, political drama and Indian judiciary.

Cast 

 Manav Kaul as Kawas Manekshaw Nanavati
 Elli AvrRam as Sylvia Nanavati
 Sumeet Vyas as Ram Jethmalani
 Viraf Patel as Prem Ahuja
 Makrand Deshpande as Chandu Trivedi
 Soni Razdan as Mehra Nanavati
 Saurabh Shukla as Russi Karanjia
Ivan Rodrigues as Admiral Katari
 Swanand Kirkire as Justice R.B.Mehta
 Angad Bedi as Karl Khandalavala
 Kubbra Sait as Mamie Ahuja
 Pooja Gaur as Vidya Munshi
 Rajesh Khera as Inspector John Lobo
 Avijit Dutt as V. K. Krishna Menon
 Shruti Bapna as Mrs Trivedi
 Rio Kapadia as Manekshaw Nanavati
 Kurush Deboo as S.R. Vakil
 Deepak Kriplani as Jawaharlal Nehru
 Bikramjeet Kanwarpal as Major Kohli
 Ram Gopal Bajaj as Bhai Pratap
 Khurshed Lawyer as Homi
 Nabeel Ahmed as Nitesh
 Dadhi Pandey as Reginald Pierce
 Susheel Pandey as Karunesh Pandey
 Rushad Rana as J R D Tata
 Satish Naykodi as Ganesh Gawaskar
 Pramod Ghosh as Father Hoffman
 Vaibhav Anand as Dev Anand
 Lopamudra Raut as Tabassum
 Pooja Gor as Vidya Joshi
 Anisa Butt as Sheetal

Songs 
 Midnight Walks- Broken Echoes
 You Make Me Whole- Broken Echoes
Stop Dancing- Vernon D'Souza

Episodes

References

External links 
 
Watch The Verdict - State vs Nanavati on ZEE5
 Watch The Verdict - State vs Nanavati on ALT Balaji website

2019 web series debuts
Indian drama web series
ALTBalaji original programming
ZEE5 original programming